N. indicus may refer to:
 Neodistemon indicus, a species of the nettle family of flowering plants
 Neolithodes indicus, a species of deep-sea king crab
Neoseiulus indicus, a species of mite
 Nitratireductor indicus, a species of deep-sea bacteria

Synonyms 
Notidanus indicus, a synonym of Notorynchus cepedianus, the broadnose sevengill shark

See also
 Indicus (disambiguation)